The Roma Point Bridge, is a  cable-stayed bridge under construction between the towns of Quezon and Calauag in Quezon, Philippines. The bridge will connect Alabat Island and its three municipalities of Perez, Alabat, and Quezon with the rest of Luzon Island, which are separated by the Silangan Pass. Once completed, it will be the longest bridge in Quezon Province and the Calabarzon Region.

History
Alabat Island and its three municipalities of Perez, Alabat and Quezon, are separated from the rest of Luzon by the Silangan Pass, a narrow passage between Lopez Bay and Calauag Bay to the west and east of the island, respectively. As such, the more than 43,000 people living on the island who have important business in Manila or the provincial capital Lucena have to take a 45-minute RORO ferry from the Port of Alabat that crosses Lopez Bay to the Port of Atimonan in Quezon Province. However, scheduled ferry service can be interrupted by inclement weather or mechanical problems in the ferries, which inconveniences travelers. Alternatively, travelers can take the shorter 15-minute boat ride across Silangan Pass to Barangay Agoho in Calauag, Quezon but these can only take passengers and cargo and not motor vehicles.

The provincial government of Quezon has long envisioned a bridge that would connect Alabat Island with the rest of the province to facilitate safer travel of people and cargo and to spur economic growth in the municipalities of the island. A feasibility study to determine the safest, most stable and most economical crossing to Alabat Island was commissioned by Quezon Province 4th District Rep. Angelita "Helen" D. Tan and it was determined that a bridge across Silangan Pass is the best location. The Department of Public Works and Highways (DPWH) has allocated an initial funding of PH₱ 250 million out of the total estimated cost of PH₱ 1 billion for the construction of the bridge.

Construction
In March 2018, a groundbreaking ceremony was held in Barangay Agoho in Calauag, Quezon, attended by DPWH Secretary Mark Villar, Representative Tan, DPWH Region 4-A Director Samson Hebra and the mayors of Perez, Alabat and Quezon, marking the start of construction for the bridge. Early photos of the bridge's architectural plan showed a cable-stayed bridge design. To facilitate construction, the Hondagua-Roma Point Road which connects Barangay Agoho in Calauag, Quezon and Barangay Hondagua in Lopez had to be widened to accommodate four-wheeled vehicles. Construction of the bridge approach on the Lopez side also commenced. The concrete foundation of the piers have already been constructed by March 2020 and by November 2020, several piers on the bridge approach have already been erected. Once completed, it will be the longest bridge in Quezon Province, longer than the  span of Kalilayan Bridge in Unisan, Quezon, which is the current record holder. It would also be the longest bridge in the Calabarzon Region, until the Bataan-Cavite Interlink Bridge is completed. However, no date of completion has been set for the bridge.

References

See also
 Bataan-Cavite Interlink Bridge

Cable-stayed bridges
Bridges in the Philippines
Cable-stayed bridges in the Philippines
Buildings and structures in Quezon